John Olaf Todahl (1884–1924) was an American illustrator and cartoonist. He worked principally as a newspaper editorial cartoonist.

Biography
John Olaf Todahl traveled throughout his career, living on both coasts of the United States. He illustrated for newspapers in Seattle, New York and Connecticut.
While in Seattle, he joined the Seattle Cartoonists' Club, an association of Seattle newspaper cartoonists, getting together outside of their newspapers for a creative and business venture. They produced The Cartoon; A Reference Book of Seattle's Successful Men (1911), a vanity cartoon book with caricatures, cartoons and photos of Seattle's wealthy and prominent citizens.

He moved to the East Coast of the United States between 1911 and 1913, settling in Connecticut with his wife, Margery Todahl Blokhine, and daughter, Virginia (born 1919). He also spent time in New York.  After he moved to the east coast, he began to have success branching out into other areas of illustration. The work that he is remembered for today is a painting he did for the Red Cross during World War I in May 1918. It featured the picture of a medic caring for a wounded soldier, signaling for help.  He did a second cover for the Red Cross in August 1918, a soldier carrying a wounded military service dog. His other works were of marine themes, of military ships at sea, struggling with the elements and fighting. Though he moved into magazines, he continued to make a living from news illustrations, including the Bridgeport Standard in the Connecticut town where he lived, and the New York Tribune.

North Atlantic Voyage 
He struck a friendship with  William Washburn Nutting (1884-1924) an author for whom he illustrated the book Cinderellas of the Fleet  and the two traveled together to Norway in 1924. Todahl's father was from Norway and it gave him a chance to visit his father's home country while painting "marine scenes along the rugged coast of Norway".
In Norway, Nutting bought a boat, and the two (along with author Arthur S. Hildebrand) decided to sail the boat from Bergen, Norway back to the North American, along with stops in Iceland and Greenland.  This voyage was reported in the newspapers to be "the first voyage over that tossing, ice-choked northern path in a boat so small since the Vikings sailed their dragon ships to Vinland".<ref name=vikingpath>[http://www.genealogybank.com/gbnk/newspapers/doc/v2:13871D95C4CF3082%40GBNEWS-1399EC7E1AAECF24%40-1399E36F03365C9A%40/ Winston-Salem Journal, 1924-11-23, page 31, top of page, first two columns. Spouse of Lost Explorer Slow to Give Up Hope For Safety.]</ref> That account ignored the Viking ship reenactment that sailed from Norway to the United States in 1893. This final artistic voyage, on a ship named Leiv Eriksson'', ended in a combination of seaborne ice and a winter hurricane sometime between August and November 1924.

References

External links
Cinderellas of the Fleet, book with his illustration; he and the author died together at sea.
The Cartoon; A Reference Book of Seattle's Successful Men Frank Calvert (ed.), Metropolitan Press, Seattle, 1911]
Oil on paperboard illustration, "Boy's Life" showing sailors fighting at sea.
Nautical scene showing shipwrecked sailors

1884 births
1924 deaths
American editorial cartoonists
American caricaturists
American illustrators
American printmakers
Artists from Seattle
Artists from New York City
People from Milford, Connecticut
American people of Norwegian descent
People from Crookston, Minnesota